David Reale is a Canadian actor. Reale gained fame at the age of 16 for voicing Kai Hiwatari from the original Beyblade anime series, which ran from 2001-2005. From 2010-2013, Reale provided the voice of another Beyblade character, Tsubasa Otori, in Beyblade: Metal Fusion/Masters/Fury. He had a recurring role in Suits between 2011 and 2019 playing Benjamin.

Early life
Reale was raised in Caledon, Ontario, and attended Robert F. Hall Catholic Secondary School.

Career
Reale's first notable appearance was as Glen Coco, a minor role in Mean Girls. His most notable television role is Benjamin on Suits.

Reale rose to fame as a child voice actor by voicing Kai Hiwatari on the English version of Beyblade,  and also the voice actor of Tsubasa Otori from the spin-off series Beyblade: Metal Fusion. For a brief amount of time, he also voiced Ace Grit and Ren Krawler from the anime series Bakugan: New Vestroia and Bakugan: Gundalian Invaders respectively. Reale replaced Alex House as Ace's voice actor towards the end of New Vestroia, and he voiced Ren during the early parts of Gundalian Invaders, before being replaced by Peter Cugno for the remainder of the season.

In 2016 he starred as the titular character in a Canadian stage adaptation of My Name Is Asher Lev.

Filmography

References

External links
 
 

20th-century Canadian male actors
21st-century Canadian male actors
Canadian male child actors
Canadian male film actors
Canadian male television actors
Canadian male voice actors
Living people
Male actors from Ontario
Year of birth missing (living people)